Malappuram Collectorate is the  administrative  headquarters  of the Malappuram District of Kerala State.Headquarters of the district administration is at Malappuram, with Collectorate and main offices in the Civil Station, established in the erstwhile headquarters of the Territorial Army. Most of the buildings in civil station  including District Collector's chamber  was constructed during the British rule and are unique. The  Collectorate  is headed by the District  Collector, an Indian Administrative Service (IAS) officer. Present District Collector is Mr Premkumar IAS It is also district  headquarters of Land Revenue & Disaster Management Department, most important wing of the state administration. Offices of The Additional District Magistrate & Deputy Collector (General),Deputy Collector (Land Acquisition),Deputy Collector (Revenue Recovery), Deputy Collector (Disaster Management), Deputy Collector (Election), Deputy Collector (Land Reforms) and office of the Senior Finance Officer are also functioning in Collectorate Building.

Politics of Malappuram district
Malappuram